Kebson Kamanga (born 16 June 1997) is a Zambian football defender who currently plays for Zanaco F.C.

References

1997 births
Living people
Zambian footballers
Zambia international footballers
Zanaco F.C. players
Nkwazi F.C. players
Association football defenders